Nanda Nandhita is a 2012 Indian romantic drama film directed by Ramshiva. The film was made simultaneously in Tamil and Telugu with Hemachandran, Surya Pratap, and Meghana Raj. The film is a remake of the 2008 Kannada film Nanda Loves Nanditha. In the Tamil version, Hemachandran portrays the protagonist and Surya Pratap portrays the antagonist. In the Telugu version, the roles are reversed.

Cast 
Hemachandran as Nanda (Tamil version)
Surya Pratap as Nanda (Telugu version)
Meghana Raj as Nandhita
Nassar as a thug
Shanmugarajan as a politician
Hemalatha
Sudha
Muthukaalai
Surya Prabhakar

Release 
Tamil version
A critic from Sify wrote that "With crass item number, songs which come as speed breakers, subplots, flashback within flashbacks, jarring background score, and lot of violence, this mass film fails to impress". A critic from The New Indian Express wrote that " It’s surprising that a Kannada flick which created no great ripples at the box office, and had a routine scenario so familiar to Tamil audiences, should be chosen to be remade in Tamil". A reviewer from The Times of India gave the film a rating of one out of five stars and noted that "The film manages the astonishing feat of falling even below expectations".

Telugu version
A critic from The Times of India gave the film a rating of one out of five stars and stated that "There are some movies which are so bad you can at least crack up about how bad they are. Nanda Nandita isn’t one of them". A critic wrote that "In essence; Nanda Nanditha lacked basic elements that make any film watchable".

Soundtrack 
The songs were composed by Emil Mohammed. The Tamil lyrics were written by Vaali, Kabilan, Snehan, Viveka, and Jayantha.

References

2012 romantic drama films
2012 films
Indian romantic drama films
 Indian multilingual films
 Tamil remakes of Kannada films
 Telugu remakes of Kannada films
2012 multilingual films
2010s Tamil-language films
2010s Telugu-language films